Ans is a Dutch feminine given name, a short form of either Anna or Johanna. People with the name include:

Ans van den Berg (1873–1942), Dutch painter
Ans Bouwmeester (fl. 1980s), Dutch Paralympic athlete
Ans Dekker (born 1955), Dutch artistic gymnast
Ans van Dijk (1905–1948), Dutch-Jewish collaborator with Nazi Germany
Ans Dresden-Polak (1906–1943), Dutch-Jewish gymnast and holocaust victim
Ans van Gerwen (born 1951), Dutch artistic gymnast
Ans Gravesteijn (born 1951), Dutch rower
Ans van Kemenade (born 1954), Dutch professor of English linguistics
Ans Koning (1922–2006), Dutch javelin thrower
Ans Luttge-Deetman (1867-1952), Dutch painter
Ans Markus (born 1947), Dutch painter
Ans Panhorst-Niesink (1918–2010), Dutch discus thrower and shot putter
Ans Schut (born 1944), Dutch speed skater
Ans Timmermans (1919–1958), Dutch swimmer
Ans Westra (1936–2023), Dutch-born New Zealand photographer
Ans Wortel (1929–1996), Dutch painter, poet and writer
Ans Woud, a pseudonym of Setske de Haan (1889–1948), Dutch children's writer

See also

Ant (name)

Dutch feminine given names